William Saint Clair may refer to:

 William St. Clair (1410–1484 aka William Sinclair), 1st Earl of Caithness
 William St Clair of Roslin (1700–1778), of the Clan Sinclair, 21st Baron of Roslin
 William St Clair (1937–2021), British historian
 William St Clair Grant (1894–1918), Scottish rugby player
 William St. Clair Tisdall (1859–1928), Anglican priest

See also
 William Sinclair (disambiguation), as "Saint Clair" is an archaic variant of "Sinclair"
 Saint Clair (disambiguation)
 William (disambiguation)
 Clair (disambiguation)